Christocentric is a  doctrinal term within Christianity, describing theological positions that focus on Jesus Christ, the second person of the Christian Trinity, in relation to the Godhead/God the Father (theocentric) or the Holy Spirit (pneumocentric).  Christocentric theologies make Christ the central theme about which all other theological positions/doctrines are oriented.

Augustinism 
Certain theological traditions within the Christian Church can be described as more heavily Christocentric. Notably, the teachings of Augustine of Hippo and Paul of Tarsus, which have been very influential in the West, place a great emphasis on the person of Jesus in the process of salvation.

For instance, in Reformation theology, the Lutheran tradition is seen as more theologically Christocentric, as it places its doctrine of justification by grace, which is primarily a Christological doctrine, at the center of its thought. Meanwhile, the Calvinist tradition is seen as more theologically theocentric, as it places its doctrine of the sovereignty of God ("the Father") at the center.

John Duns Scotus 
Scotus is famous for his belief in the Absolute Primacy of Christ, whereby Christ would have become incarnate even had the Fall never taken place. Scotus writes "that God predestined this soul [of Christ] to so great a glory does not seem to be only on account of [redemption], since the redemption or the glory of the soul to be redeemed is not comparable to the glory of Christ’s soul.  Neither is it likely that the highest good in creation is something that was merely occasioned only because of some lesser good; nor is it likely that He predestined Adam to such good before He predestined Christ; and yet this would follow [were the Incarnation occasioned by Adam’s sin].  In fact, if the predestination of Christ’s soul was for the sole purpose of redeeming others, something even more absurd would follow, namely, that in predestining Adam to glory, He would have foreseen him as having fallen into sin before He predestined Christ to glory". As such, Scotus' theology is grounded in the claim that Creation exists for the sake of Christ, regardless of whether any individual chooses to sin.

John Paul II 
John Paul II's magisterium has been called Christocentric by Catholic theologians. He further taught that the Marian devotions of the Rosary were in fact Christocentric because they brought the faithful to Jesus through Mary.

Biblical hermeneutics 
The christocentric principle is also commonly used for biblical hermeneutics.

Interfaith and ecumenism 
Christocentrism is also a name given to a particular approach in interfaith and ecumenical dialogue. It teaches that Christianity is absolutely true, but the elements of truth in other religions are always in relation to the fullness of truth found in Christianity. The Holy Spirit is thought to allow inter-religious dialogue and to influence non-believers in their journey to Christ. This view is notably advocated by the Catholic Church in the declarations Nostra aetate, Unitatis Redintegratio and Dominus Iesus.

See also 
 Solus Christus
 Christology

References 

Christology
Lutheran theology
Christian terminology